Vitali Viktorovich Tikhonov (born 31 January 1984) is a former Russian professional footballer.

Club career
He played in the Kazakhstan Premier League for FC Vostok in 2009.

External links
 
 

1984 births
Footballers from Kazan
Living people
Russian footballers
Association football defenders
FC Rubin Kazan players
FC Vostok players
FC Khimik Dzerzhinsk players
FC Dynamo Kirov players
Kazakhstan Premier League players
Russian expatriate footballers
Expatriate footballers in Kazakhstan
Russian expatriate sportspeople in Kazakhstan